Malbry ("pronounced "Mawbry") is the fictional village that serves as the setting for Joanne Harris' Yorkshire-based thrillers, notably Blueeyedboy, Gentlemen and Players and Different Class . It is also the setting for a number of Harris' short stories.

Malbry is a village in the north of England, comprising several districts, including: White City (a council estate); Red City (an older, more downtrodden estate, mostly of brick-built terraced houses); Malbry Village (a more affluent, middle-class area); and Millionnaires' Row, a wealthy part of Malbry Village. There are several schools; including Abbey Road Juniors, a primary school; Sunnybank Comprehensive, the local state school and St Oswald's Grammar School, the independent boys' grammar school which is the setting for Gentlemen and Players.

It is a close community, rife with conflicting factions. Outsiders are not welcome, and those who do not fit in are the subject of gossip and speculation. There is a great deal of snobbery, and there is bitter rivalry between the state school and St Oswald's, the grammar school.

Runemarks

Malbry is also the name of Maddy's home village in Harris' Rune books, Runemarks and Runelight. Although significantly different in geographical terms, there is the same insular mentality in both versions of Malbry. Both feature snobbish, influential village leaders and outsiders who are made to suffer for the crime of not fitting in. Both are very traditional, even backward-thinking, and gossip plays an important role in determining who belongs and who does not.

Notes

There is some evidence to suggest that the fictional Malbry is based on Harris' home village of Almondbury, near Huddersfield, in Yorkshire. In the Rune books, Red Horse Hill is sometimes referred to as "Castle Hill", a noted Huddersfield landmark. Other real-life places referred to in Runemarks and Runelight are: Farnley Tyas (which is also the name of a village near Almondbury) and the nearby Molly Carr Woods.

References
The Joanne Harris Website
Express review of Blueeyedboy.

Fictional populated places in England